The Baltimore gold hoard was a discovery of gold coins by two teenage boys in Baltimore, Maryland in 1934.

On August 31, 1934, Theodore Jones, 16, and Henry Grob, 15, found 3,558 gold coins in two copper pots in Jones' house. The hoard consisted of  $1, $2.50, $5, $10 and $20 gold coins from the 1830s, 1840s and 1850s.

The boys were unable to keep the gold due to the Gold Reserve Act of 1933 which made private ownership of gold illegal.  They therefore turned the gold over to the police. 

After numerous legal proceedings with several parties claiming the gold was theirs, in 1935, the coins were sold at auction for a total of $20,000. The two boys were awarded $6,000 to become available to them when they turned 21. Grob, however, died before then.

References

Further reading
 Leonard Augsburger, Treasure in the Cellar: A Tale of Gold in Depression-Era Baltimore. Maryland Historical Society, 2008.
 Jack Myers,  Knights' Gold. CreateSpace Independent Publishing, 2016.

United States gold coins
Treasure troves of the United States
1934 in Maryland
History of Baltimore